Shirley Viviana Berruz Aguilar (born 6 January 1991) is an Ecuadorian footballer who plays as a goalkeeper for Super Liga Femenina club América de Quito and the Ecuador women's national team.

International career
Berruz represented Ecuador at the 2008 South American U-17 Women's Championship. At senior level, she played entirely the three matches Ecuador had in the 2015 FIFA Women's World Cup.

References

External links
 
 Profile  at FEF
 

1991 births
Living people
Women's association football goalkeepers
Ecuadorian women's footballers
Sportspeople from Guayaquil
Ecuador women's international footballers
2015 FIFA Women's World Cup players
Pan American Games competitors for Ecuador
Footballers at the 2015 Pan American Games
L.D.U. Quito Femenino players
C.D. Universidad Católica del Ecuador footballers
21st-century Ecuadorian women